Craig H. Nakamura (born July 19, 1956) is a former judge of the Hawaii Intermediate Court of Appeals.

Education
Nakamura received a Bachelor of Arts from the University of Hawaiʻi in 1978, and a Juris Doctor from Harvard Law School, graduating cum laude in 1981.

Career
After law school, Nakamura served as a law clerk for United States circuit judge Herbert Choy. He then worked as an associate attorney with the law firm of Goodsill, Anderson, Quinn & Stifel. Then, in 1986, he became an assistant United States attorney and was in this position until his appointment to the Hawaii Intermediate Court of Appeals. He previously taught appellate advocacy as an adjunct professor at the William S. Richardson School of Law and served as a director of the Hawaii State Bar Association.

Judicial career
Nakamura was appointed to the court on Intermediate Court of Appeals as an associate judge on April 8, 2004 by Governor Linda Lingle. On July 22, 2009 Nakamura was named chief judge of the court by Governor Linda Lingle. He was sworn in as chief judge on September 16, 2009. He retired from active service in March 2018.

See also
List of Asian American jurists

References

External links

1956 births
Living people
20th-century American lawyers
21st-century American lawyers
21st-century American judges
American jurists of Japanese descent
Assistant United States Attorneys
Harvard Law School alumni
Hawaii state court judges
Hawaii lawyers
Hawaii people of Japanese descent
People from Honolulu
University of Hawaiʻi at Mānoa alumni
William S. Richardson School of Law faculty